Sir Harshad "Harry" Kumar Dharamshi Hansraj Bhadeshia  (born 27 November 1953) is an Indian-British metallurgist and Emeritus Tata Steel Professor of Metallurgy at the University of Cambridge. In 2022 he joined Queen Mary University of London as Professor of Metallurgy.

Education and early life 
Bhadeshia was born in Kenya to Indian parents, who were carpenters. During the 19th century, many Indian workers emigrated to Kenya for building bridges, railway tracks, shops etc. Bhadeshia's interest in science started when he visited the battery shop where his father worked. He was educated at the Kongoni Primary School followed by the Highway Secondary School, both in Nairobi.

He moved with his family to the United Kingdom in 1970 and joined the British Oxygen Company in Edmonton as a technician in their metallurgical quality control laboratory. This allowed him study part-time at the East Ham College of Technology in London, for the Ordinary National Certificate in Science. He then moved to the quality control laboratory at Murex Welding Processes, and they sponsored him to study at the City of London Polytechnic where he graduated with a Bachelor of Science degree in 1976. Professor Robert Honeycombe was at the time the External Examiner for the course at the Polytechnic and encouraged him to join his research group at the University of Cambridge. He was admitted to the University of Cambridge to work on the theory and significance of retained austenite in steels and obtained his PhD in 1980 supervised by David V. Edmonds, in Honeycombe's Steel Research Group. The nature of austenite that is retained depends on the preceding phase transformations – as a research student he focused therefore on unravelling the choreography of atoms when austenite undergoes bainitic or martensitic transformation.

Career and research
Bhadeshia's research is concerned with the theory of solid-state transformations in metals, particularly multicomponent steels, with the goal of creating novel alloys and processes with the minimum use of resources.

Following his PhD, he worked as a Science Research Council Research Fellow until 1981 and has been part of the academic staff at the University of Cambridge since then. He is the author or co-author of more than 650 published papers in the field of metallurgy and several books.

In the 1990s, he worked with British Steel plc on a carbide-free, silicon-rich bainitic steel that was used for rails in the Channel Tunnel and later on a high-performance armour steel for the British Ministry of Defence.

In 2006, he was awarded the Bessemer Gold Medal by the Institute of Materials, Minerals and Mining for "outstanding services to the Steel Industry". In November 2008, he was appointed the first Tata Steel Professor of Metallurgy following a donation by Tata Steel to endow this chair on a permanent basis at the University of Cambridge and he established and took the lead of the new "SKF University Technology Centre", between SKF and the University of Cambridge to conduct research in the field of the physical metallurgy of bearing steels, over the period 2009–2019.

During 2005–18, as the Founding Director of the Computational Metallurgy Laboratory, he helped create the Graduate Institute for Ferrous Technology at POSTECH in the Republic of Korea.

Teaching 
Bhadeshia has developed a wide range of freely accessible teaching materials on metallurgy and associated subjects. The subject matters cover crystallography, metals and alloys, steels in particular, phase transformation theory, thermodynamics, kinetics, mathematical modelling in materials science, information theory, process modelling, thermal analysis, ethics and natural philosophy.

The resources include lecture notes, slides, videos, algorithms, review articles, books, cartoons, audio files, experimental data archives, image libraries, seminars, examples classes, question sheets and answers, automated learning (MOOCS), and a diverse range of other electronic resources.  A YouTube channel (bhadeshia123) contains about 1300 educational videos.

The resources are archived as a permanent record by the British Library in an open access mode. For "outstanding teaching activities", he was conferred the Adams Memorial Membership Award of the American Welding Society during 2007.

Editorial positions 
Bhadhesia has served as editor for the following journals:
 Materials Science and Engineering: A
  Materials Science and Technology
  Science and Technology of Welding and Joining

Awards and honours 

 1992: Hume Rothery Prize
 1994: Rosenhain Medal & Prize
 1997: Royal Society Armourers and Brasiers' Company Prize
 1998: Elected a Fellow of the Royal Society (FRS)
 2001: Reaumur Medal of the French Society of Metallurgy and Materials
 2002: Fellow of the Royal Academy of Engineering (FREng)
 2003: Aditya Birla Chair, Indian Institute of Science, Bangalore
 2004: Foreign Fellow of the Indian National Academy of Engineering
 2006: Bessemer Gold Medal
 2008: Tata Steel Professor of Metallurgy
 2008: Fellow of the American Welding Society
 2009: Director of the SKF University Technology Centre
 2010: Honorary Member of the Iron and Steel Institute of Japan
 2015: Knight Bachelor in the Queen's 2015 Birthday Honours
 2016: Honorary Fellowship of The Welding Institute
 2017: Adolf Martens Medal, Germany
 2017: Membre d'Honneur de la SF2M
 2018: Foreign Fellow, The National Academy of Sciences, India
 2019: Lee Hsun Lecture Award, Institute of Metals Research, Chinese Academy of Sciences
 2022: Henry Clifton Sorby Award, International Metallographic Society, ASM International

References 

Living people
1953 births
British metallurgists
Fellows of Darwin College, Cambridge
Fellows of the Royal Society
Fellows of the Royal Academy of Engineering
Foreign Fellows of the Indian National Science Academy
Knights Bachelor
Alumni of London Metropolitan University
Alumni of the University of Cambridge
Kenyan emigrants to the United Kingdom
Bessemer Gold Medal
Fellows of the Institute of Materials, Minerals and Mining